CH Collins Stadium is a 12,000-capacity multi-use stadium in Denton, Texas. The stadium is used mostly for high school football and soccer. In the offseason of 2013, the field was upgraded with new artificial turf.

In the media
In 2007, Under Armour filmed part of a popular commercial series called "Click-Clack" at the athletic complex.

Radio and television
A nationally televised game between Southlake Carroll High School and Denton Ryan High School was aired on Fox Sports Network on Thursday, Oct. 13, 2005. Select Denton ISD games played at C.H. Collins are broadcast on KNTU-FM (88.1 The One) and the Denton ISD Television Channel.

References

Sports in Denton, Texas
Buildings and structures completed in 2004
Buildings and structures in Denton, Texas
American football venues in the Dallas–Fort Worth metroplex
High school football venues in Texas
Soccer venues in Texas
Sports venues completed in 2004
2004 establishments in Texas
Tourist attractions in Denton, Texas